Soviet ship Stary Bolshevik (translated as Old Bolshevik) was a Soviet lumber steamship. It took part in several arctic convoys of World War II as a general-purpose cargo ship. For the heroic actions while taking part in Convoy PQ 16 the ship was awarded the Order of Lenin, its captain, first deputy for political matters, and helmsman were awarded Hero of the Soviet Union, and the whole crew were awarded various orders and medals.

Actions

Spanish Civil War
The ship took part in Operation X, a secret Soviet weapons shipment to the Republicans during the Spanish Civil War.

World War Two
The first trip of the ship was from Arkhangelsk to England in September 1941. In January 1942 she brought military cargo to Murmansk as part of Convoy PQ 8. The next trip was with Convoy QP 13 to New York with the load of apatites, where she picked military equipment and returned to Iceland where it joined Convoy PQ 16.

Convoy PQ 16
It was the 4th (homebound leg of the 2nd roundtrip) convoy for the ship. The ship was placed last in the order. It carried over 4,000 tonnes of load, including ammunition and explosives, as well as A-20 Boston bombers on the deck. The latter was an attractive target for German bombers. The ship was heavily bombed and set on fire, but the crew did not leave the ship and saved it and the cargo. During lulls between German attacks the neighboring  helped Stary Bolshevik with fire hoses and pumping the water out, and with doctor. On that occasion British sailors were surprised to learn that about 50% of Stary Bolshevik's crew were women.

Awards
Awarded Hero of the Soviet Union, helmsman Boris Akazyonok also had the combat assignment of an anti-aircraft gunner. In the commendation it was reported that due to his skillful maneuvering he three times avoided torpedo attacks. When bombing caused fire, he was one of the first to rush into the cargo hold with bomb fuses to move them into a safer place. Also, operating the aft anti-aircraft gun he downed a German torpedo bomber.

In 1942 Captain  was awarded Hero of the Soviet Union. In 1943 he was awarded Officer of the Order of the British Empire (civil division).

In 1942 first deputy for political matters  was awarded Hero of the Soviet Union.

In 1943 senior motorist N.N. Pugachyov was awarded Member of the Order of the British Empire (civil division).

The ship itself was awarded the Order of Lenin, displayed on ship's flag.

References

Lumber ships
World War II merchant ships of the Soviet Union
Merchant ships of the Soviet Union